Headquarters for the Protection of Russian Schools is a movement in Latvia for the preservation of public secondary education in Russian. Its leaders are Vladimir Buzayev, Yury Petropavlovsky, Miroslav Mitrofanov, Mihail Tyasin, Viktor Dergunov, and for some time also Alexander Kazakov (deported out of Latvia in 2004). One of its most prominent spokesmen is Yakov Pliner.

Aims of the movement
Cancelling the Education law provisions, which originally ordered the language of instruction in public secondary schools (Forms 10-12) to be only Latvian (later, at least 60% Latvian) since 2004. It also supports providing effective learning of Latvian language in the Latvian language and literature lessons and specific preparation of teachers for Russian schools.

History

The staff was founded in April 2003 as a coalition of various organizations, most prominent being ForHRUL, and later expanded, involving nonpartisan people. In 2003–2004, the Staff has organized political demonstrations (according to the Freedom House and political scientist T. Boguševiča, the biggest ones in Latvia since the beginning of the 1990s) to protest to expanding use of Latvian language in Russian schools. Freedom House has also noted that "Over half of all Russian students took part in protests."

As a result, the Education Law was amended in February 2004, allowing to teach up to 40% in the forms 10-12 in minority languages. The proportion of teaching 60% of subjects in Latvian and 40% in Russian, according to BISS research, was supported by 20% of the teachers, 15% of pupils and 13% of parents in minority schools and most stated that they would rather support bilingual instruction in all subjects; only 15% of teachers thought that no reform was needed, while this opinion was expressed by 36% of parents and 44% of pupils. The parliamentary opposition started two cases before the Constitutional Court of Latvia (abjudicated in May and September, 2005) with most of its demands being refused.

See also 
 Russian language in Latvia
 Language policy in Latvia

References

External links
English
D. Wilson Minority Rights in Education: Lessons for the EU from Estonia, Latvia (..), 2002 — p. 36—43
List of the most considerable protests in 2003-2005
Latvians face new wall: language (CNN, 2004)
Excerpts from RFE/RL news on Baltic minorities, January-April 2004
Teachers in crossfire over Latvia's school reform (Reuters, 2004)
Thousands of Russian speakers protest new school language rules (AP, 2004)
Protests mark Latvia's EU entry, 2004, and Latvian lessons irk Russians, 2005. BBC
Judgement of Latvia's Constitutional Court regarding the Education Law provisions on medium of instruction, 2005
Latvian minorities: The educational reform British Helsinki Human Rights Group, 2005
Discussion in the European Parliament, 2005
Russian and Latvian
Staff site  
Staff video clip «Black Karlis» (referring to then-minister for education Kārlis Šadurskis) 
Basic excerpts from Staff documents, international treaties and links: , 
Education law — edition being in force between 27.02.2004. and 15.09.2005.
Chronicle of Staff actions: 2003-2004, 2004-2005

Education policy
Education in Latvia
Linguistic rights
Nonviolent resistance movements
Minority rights
Minority schools
Politics of Latvia
Russian-language education
Russians in Latvia
Human rights organisations based in Latvia